The International Rally of Whangarei is a rally racing event held in Whangarei, New Zealand. The first event was run in 2007 replacing the International Rally of Rotorua as New Zealand's round of the Asia Pacific Rally Championship (APRC). With the World Rally Championship's move to a rotational calendar means that the International Rally of Whangarei becomes in the years Rally New Zealand is not held, New Zealand largest rally event. The rally also hosts a round of the New Zealand Rally Championship. While originally being a late season event, today it is held in May and is the season opening event in the APRC. The rally has been sponsored by automotive lighting manufacturer Hella for most of the events history but is now unsponsored.

The Whangarei area, in the northernmost part of New Zealand's North Island, is a former host of Rally New Zealand. The event has had remarkably few winners over its history with local driver Hayden Paddon having won seven editions, whereas Indian Gaurav Gill has won three times and Australian Chris Atkinson has won twice.

The first event saw Paddon take victory after a rally-long battle with Cody Crocker. The following year former New Zealand champion Chris West took victory over Paddon and Crocker. Paddon defeated Crocker again in 2009 and took his third victory in 2010 over Emma Gilmour. 2011 was the first time the rally was won by a non-local with Chris Atkinson winning over Paddon. Atkinson won again in 2012 ahead of Per-Gunnar Andersson. 2013 saw Paddon take his fourth win ahead of Esapekka Lappi.

Winners

Event Sponsors

References

Rally competitions in New Zealand
Recurring sporting events established in 2007
Whangarei
Whangārei